Amarna Letter EA3 is a letter of correspondence between Nimu'wareya, this being the ruler of Egypt, Amenḥotep III, and Kadašman-Enlil, the king of Babylon. In the Moran translation, the letter is given the cursory or synoptic title Marriage, grumblings, a palace opening.  The letter is part of a series of correspondences from Babylonia to Egypt, which run from EA2 to EA4 and EA6 to EA14. EA1 and EA5 are from Egypt to Babylonia.

The contents of the letter is as follows:

See also
Chronology of the ancient Near East
Amarna letters: EA 1, EA 2, EA 4, EA 5, EA 6, EA 7, EA 8, EA 9, EA 10, EA 11

References

External links
K Avruch - Reciprocity, Equality, and Status-Anxiety in the Amarna letters Amarna Diplomacy: The Beginnings of International Relations published by JHU Press, 18 Sep 2002, 328 pages, 

Amarna letters